The streamliners are a class of streamlined railway cars built in the 1940s through the 1950s for long distance passenger railservices in North America.

Predecessors

The first streamliner in the United States was the M-10000 in service with the  Union Pacific Railroad in February 1934. The second was the Pioneer Zephyr in service with the
Chicago, Burlington and Quincy Railroad. Both were built as Diesel Multiple-Units; the M-10000 was made of aluminum and the Pioneer Zephyr of stainless steel.

Modernization
In 1944 American Car and Foundry (ACF) was visited by the Spanish inventor Goicoechea looking for a manufacturer for his invention, the lightweight articulated streamlined Talgo. ACF and Goicoechea signed the contract on December 8, 1945 and ACF began fabricating three trainsets, two for Spain and one for demonstration and experimental purposes in the USA. ACF built the Talgo using a lightmetal body like Budd's Pioneer Zephyr including the non-European observation cars at the rear. It wasn't until 1955 that ACF could sell the Talgo concept but ACF got familiar with the techniques needed. After the Second World War the railroad companies in the United States wanted to modernize their fleets of passenger cars. They chose the flexibility of individual cars instead of multiple-units or Talgo. However the design of the streamlined cars was derived from the Pioneer Zephyr, although the Pullman cars got a smooth body surface and the others the typical ribbed body surface. The streamliner cars were built by three manufacturers of railway stock, the Budd Company, the Pullman Company, and American Car and Foundry in ten different types:
Railway post office
Baggage car
Diner
Vista Dome
Observation car
Dome observation car
Dome car with dormitory for trainstaff
Coach
Sleeper
Duplex

In operation
One of the most notable trains equipped with Streamlined cars was the California Zephyr jointly operated by Chicago, Burlington and Quincy Railroad (CB&Q), Denver and Rio Grande Western Railroad (D&RGW) and Western Pacific Railroad (WP). Other US railroads followed and by 1955 the Canadian National Railway and the Canadian Pacific Railway also operated trains, e.g. The Canadian, with Streamlined cars. 

In 1971 Amtrak received 1200 streamliner cars as heritage-fleet from the US railroads. After refurbishment the cars were used until the late 1990s/early 2000s, with some cars, chiefly baggage and dining cars, used into the late 2010s, until Amtrak retired all of its heritage equipment in 2019. The Canadian Via Rail still operates trains with streamlined cars.

External links
A History Of PRR's Streamlined Services, The So-Called "Fleet Of Modernism"

References

North American streamliner trains